Fatima Trotta (born 2 July 1986) is an Italian actress, comedian and television presenter.

Life and career
Born in Naples, as a child Trotta participated to several beauty pageants, and at young age she worked  in a Neapolitan free channel TV program hosted by Maria Teresa Ruta. After appearing in the Rai 1 talent show I Raccomandati in 2005, she made her professional debut as an actress in the Rai 3 TV series Un Posto al Sole.

From 2009 Trotta is the presenter of the variety show Made in Sud, first broadcast on Comedy Central and later on Rai 2.

References

External links
  

1986 births
Living people
Mass media people from Naples
Italian television actresses
Italian film actresses
Italian stage actresses
21st-century Italian actresses
21st-century Italian comedians
Italian women comedians
Italian women television presenters